Torill Fonn (born 1 November 1967) is a Swedish ultramarathon runner from Skövde. Fonn holds the current women's Nordic record for the 48-hour run. (Skövde SWE, Aug 2015).

Competition record

International competitions

Non-championship races
2015
1st place in 48-hour run Sweden (376.939 km) 
2nd place in 24-hour run Finland (216.456 km) 
2014
1st place in 48-hour run Sweden (374.999 km) 
2nd place in 24-hour run Finland (192.421 km) 
2013
2nd place in 48-hour run Sweden (312.058 km) 
1st place in 48-hour run Australia (341.559 km) 
2011
1st place in 48-hour run Sweden (312.715 km) 
1st place in 12-hour run Norway (123.378 km)

Personal life
Fonn lives in Skövde in Sweden. She took up running as a hobby in 1995 and ran her first ultramarathon in 2004.

References

1967 births
Living people
Swedish ultramarathon runners
Swedish female long-distance runners
Swedish female marathon runners
Female ultramarathon runners
People from Skövde Municipality
Sportspeople from Västra Götaland County